Aftabeh (also Romanized as Āftābeh; also known as Avtafa) is a village in Sanjabad-e Gharbi Rural District, in the Central District of Kowsar County, Ardabil Province, Iran. At the 2006 census, its population was 143, in 28 families.

References 

Tageo.com

Towns and villages in Kowsar County